The 2015–16 Utah Utes women's basketball team will represent the University of Utah during the 2015–16 NCAA Division I women's basketball season. The Utes, were led by their first year head coach Lynne Roberts. They will play their home games at the Jon M. Huntsman Center in Salt Lake City, Utah and were a member of the Pac-12 Conference. They finished the season 18–15, 8–10 in Pac-12 play to finish in seventh place. They lost in the first round of the Pac-12 women's tournament to California. They were invited to the Women's National Invitation Tournament where they defeated Montana State and Gonzaga in the first and second rounds before losing to Pac-12 member Oregon in the third round.

Roster

Schedule and results 

|-
!colspan=9 style="background:#CC0000; color:white;"| Exhibition

|-
!colspan=9 style="background:#CC0000; color:white;"| Non-conference regular season

|-
!colspan=9 style="background:#CC0000; color:white;"| Pac-12 regular season

|-
!colspan=9 style="background:#CC0000;"| Pac-12 Women's Tournament

|-
!colspan=9 style="background:#CC0000;"| WNIT

Rankings
2015–16 NCAA Division I women's basketball rankings

See also
2015–16 Utah Utes men's basketball team

References 

Utah Utes women's basketball seasons
Utah
2016 Women's National Invitation Tournament participants
Utah Utes
Utah Utes